Coconut burger, also known as sapal burger or niyog burger, is a Filipino veggie burger made with shredded coconut pulp (sapal), which are the by-products of traditional coconut milk extraction in Filipino cuisine. It is considered an ovo-vegetarian dish, but not vegan since it uses eggs as part of the ingredients.

See also
 Chori burger
Piaparan
Bukayo
Laing (food)
List of meat substitutes

References 

Foods containing coconut
Vegetarian dishes of the Philippines
Meat substitutes
Vegetarian cuisine
Hamburgers (food)